Ryder Brow railway station serves the Gorton and Ryder Brow areas of Manchester, England.

Facilities
The station is unmanned and has basic amenities only - waiting shelters and timetable posters on both platforms and a payphone on platform 2.  No ticket provision is offered, so these must be bought prior to travel or on the train.  Access to the platforms is via stepped ramps from the nearby road, so the station is not suitable for wheelchair users.

Service

Monday to Friday there is an hourly service to Manchester Piccadilly northbound and New Mills Central southbound, whilst on Saturdays the frequency is the same but the service runs to  until the evening (reverting to New Mills thereafter). There is no Sunday service.

References

External links

Railway stations in Manchester
DfT Category F2 stations
Railway stations opened by British Rail
Railway stations in Great Britain opened in 1985
Northern franchise railway stations